WZIM (99.5 MHz) is a commercial FM radio station licensed to Lexington, Illinois, and serving the Bloomington-Normal radio market. The station is owned and operated by Pilot Media, and calls itself "Magic 99.5."  It broadcasts an adult contemporary radio format, but for much of November and December, it switches to Christmas music.

History

The station signed on in late 2001 as WCSO, and the call letters were soon changed to WDQZ.  It was a classic rock simulcast with WDQX in Peoria.  In December 2005 WDQX was sold, and the simulcast with WDQZ was split.  Sometime after that, the station evolved into a more straight-ahead classic hits station. In September 2009, WDQZ stunted as an all-TV-themed station for a day and a half.  On September 18, 2009, at noon, WDQZ changed back to a classic hits format.

Scott Robbins, a longtime Bloomington/Normal host, hosted mornings on "The Eagle" for many years, with two different co-hosts.  In April 2007, Mancow's Morning Madhouse was added, and Robbins moved to afternoons, then left the station in August 2007 to host mornings on Cities 92.9.  In February 2008 he returned to middays on "The Eagle".  The syndicated Nights With Alice Cooper served as the night show.

On August 17, 2010, WDQZ changed its call letters to WZIM.

On April 5, 2012, WZIM changed its format from classic hits to sports, branded as "The Ticket". The move meant that Bloomington-Normal had an all-sports radio station for the first time. Immediately after announcing the switch, 99.5 The Ticket became the B-N affiliate for the Chicago Cubs, taking over from WJEZ. WZIM was also the Bloomington-Normal affiliate for the Chicago White Sox, although the station gave first priority to the Cubs. The Ticket also aired Indianapolis Colts games in the fall. WJBC airs nearly all local sports teams.

WZIM aired one local program, The Front Row, from 4-6 p.m. The show was hosted by Dan Swaney and Paul Jackson. It was cancelled sometime in the fall of 2012.

On November 13, 2013, at 10 am, WZIM dropped its sports format and began stunting with automated classic rock songs. On November 15 at noon, it changed its format to AC as Magic 99.5, with the slogan, "80s, 90s, And Now!" and began promoting itself as the new home in Bloomington and Lexington for the syndicated John Tesh radio show in the morning.

In April 2018, Joe Greenwood took over as Program Director and added The Kidd Kraddick Morning Show. Joe Greenwood had previously been in Peoria for nearly a decade at Alpha Media being a part of WDQX, WMBD and burst onto the country scene on WXCL (where he would go on to win the "Best DJ in Peoria"). Joe has made several changes to the station, including freshing up the format to lean more towards Hot AC while still featuring 80's music with "Awesome 80's double plays" and adding "Throwback Thursday". The lineup on-air as of that time is the nationally syndicated "Kidd Kraddick Morning Show" from 6am-9am, 99 minute work day kick off from 9am-11am, former morning host and program director Adam Chandler 11am-3pm, Rick Dee's 3pm-7pm and John Tesh from 7pm-midnight. Weekends feature Jim Brickman, Rick Dees, John Tesh and locally "Johnny B". Program Director, Joe Greenwood isn't on-air on WZIM but does the mid-day show on sister station WIBL 107.7 & 92.1 The Bull with ratings success, success that Great Plains Media hopes he can bring to WZIM.

References

External links

ZIM
Radio stations established in 2001